Liu Yanqiu (born 31 December 1995) is a Chinese footballer who plays as a midfielder for Wuhan Jianghan University F.C. and the China women's national football team.

International career
Liu was part of the China squad that played in the 2012 FIFA U-17 Women's World Cup and the 2014 FIFA U-20 Women's World Cup. She made her full international debut as a substitute in a friendly match against Russia on 6 April 2019.

References

External links 

1995 births
Living people
Chinese women's footballers
China women's international footballers
Women's association football midfielders
2019 FIFA Women's World Cup players